Cardemil is a surname. Notable people with the surname include:

 Alberto Cardemil (born 1945), Chilean politician
 Ramón Cardemil (1917–2007), Chilean rodeo horse rider